Zachary Johnson is an English professional rugby league footballer who last played as a  for Hunslet in RFL League 1.

Background
Johnson was born in Dewsbury, West Yorkshire, England.

Career

Swinton Lions
Johnson started his career with the Swinton Lions and has previously spent time on loan at the Hunslet Hawks in Kingstone Press League 1.

Coventry Bears
On 3 Feb 2017 the club announced that Zach had signed for Coventry Bears

Hunslet R.L.F.C.
On 3 Jan 2020 it was reported that he had signed for Hunslet R.L.F.C. in the RFL League 1, but by Feb 2021 he had left Hunslet.

References

External links
Dewsbury Rams profile
Hunslet Hawks profile

1991 births
Living people
Coventry Bears players
Dewsbury Rams players
Doncaster R.L.F.C. players
English rugby league players
Hunslet R.L.F.C. players
Jewish rugby league players
Rugby league players from Dewsbury
Rugby league props
Swinton Lions players